The Dominion Enterprises Building is a 20-story commercial office building located in downtown Norfolk, Virginia on Granby Street. The 500,000 square foot building was opened in 2007 and is owned by Dominion Enterprises. It contains a Heritage Bank branch on the first floor.

References

See also 
List of tallest buildings in Norfolk, Virginia
List of tallest buildings in Virginia
Norfolk, Virginia
Skyscraper office buildings in Norfolk, Virginia

Office buildings completed in 2006